"Dial My Heart" is the 1988 debut single by the Boys The single on the Motown label was a crossover hit for the group, peaking at No. 1 on the Billboard R&B singles chart and No. 13 on the Billboard Hot 100 in 1988-1990. It was the group's only entry on the Dance chart, peaking at number 18.

The single entered the UK singles charts on November 5, 1988; it rose to a high of number 61, and remained in the charts for 4 weeks.

Charts

References

1988 debut singles
1988 songs
Motown singles
New jack swing songs
Song recordings produced by Babyface (musician)
Song recordings produced by L.A. Reid
Songs written by Babyface (musician)
Songs written by Daryl Simmons
Songs written by L.A. Reid